Buzuluk is the name of several inhabited localities in Russia.

Urban localities
Buzuluk, Orenburg Oblast, a town in Orenburg Oblast

Rural localities
Buzuluk, Irkutsk Oblast, a settlement in Kuytunsky District of Irkutsk Oblast
Buzuluk, Oryol Oblast, a village in Podgorodnensky Selsoviet of Maloarkhangelsky District of Oryol Oblast